The Atikameg River is a river in northeastern Kenora District in northwestern Ontario, Canada. It is in the James Bay drainage basin and is a right tributary of the Kapiskau River.

The Atikameg River begins at an unnamed lake and flows east, then northeast to its mouth at the Kapiskau River. The Kapiskau River flows to James Bay.

Tributaries
North Wabassie River (right)
Little Swan River (right)
Sagesigan River (right)
Poplar River (left)

References

Sources

Rivers of Kenora District